Nick Frost (born 10 October 1999) is an Australian rugby union player who plays for the Brumbies in Super Rugby. His playing position is lock. He has signed for the Brumbies squad in 2020.

Reference list

External links
 

1999 births
Australian rugby union players
Living people
Rugby union locks
Canberra Vikings players
ACT Brumbies players
Rugby union flankers
Australia international rugby union players